Vadsø is a town in Vadsø Municipality in Finnmark county, Norway.  The town is the administrative centre of both Vadsø Municipality and Finnmark county, and is the largest town in East Finnmark.  The town is located on the southern shore of the Varanger Peninsula, along the Varanger Fjord.  Part of the town lies on the island of Vadsøya.  It is connected to the rest of the town on the mainland by a bridge.

Vadsø Church is located in the town, and it is the seat of the dean of the Varanger prosti (deanery) which is part of the Diocese of Nord-Hålogaland. The "midnight sun" is above the horizon from 17 May to 28 July, and the period with continuous daylight lasts a bit longer. The period of polar night lasts from 26 November to 17 January.

Economy: the city has suppliers to the regional construction industries, including a concrete works. One bookstore exists.

History
In the 16th century, the settlement consisted of a fishing village and the old Vadsø Church, located on the island of Vadsøya. The settlement later moved to the mainland. Township privilege was granted in 1833, and soon settlers came from Finland and the northern part of Sweden, which suffered from famine. Finnish was rapidly becoming the language of the majority, and this continued for decades. Even today Finnish is still spoken in some households. During the occupation of Norway by Nazi Germany, Vadsø suffered several air raids from the Soviet Union, which bombed Nazi troops. However, there are, unlike most places in Finnmark, a number of 19th century wooden houses preserved close to the city centre, notably the house of Esbensen, built by a Norwegian, and the house of Tuomainen, built by a Finn. On the island of Vadsøya is the airship mast used by Umberto Nobile and Roald Amundsen for their expedition over the North Pole with the airship Norge in 1926, and used again on Nobile's flight with the airship Italia in 1928.

Municipal history
The village of Vadsø was granted town status in 1833.  In 1838, the town of Vadsø and the entire rural district surrounding the Varangerfjorden were established as the new municipality of Vadsø (see formannskapsdistrikt).  In 1839, the western district was separated to become the new municipality of Nesseby.  Then in 1858, Nesseby was merged back into Vadsø, and on the same date, the southern district of Vadsø (south of the Varangerfjorden) was separated to form the new municipality of Sør-Varanger.  A few years later in 1864, the western district of Nesseby was separated into a separate municipality once again.  In 1894, the rest of the rural district surrounding the town of Vadsø was separated to form the new municipality of Nord-Varanger.  This left just the town of Vadsø left in the municipality of Vadsø.  This remained the case until 1 January 1964, when the municipality of Nord-Varanger was merged back together with the town of Vadsø to form the present-day Vadsø Municipality.

Name
The name of the town comes from the island Vadsøya, since that was the original townsite.  The Old Norse form of the name was Vatnsøy. The first element is the genitive case of vatn which means "water" and the last element is øy which means "island". Therefore the meaning of the name is "the island with drinking water".

Transportation
The European route E75 highway goes through the town.  The Hurtigruten coastal express ships regularly stop at the pier on Vadsøya island in the town.  Vadsø Airport is located just east of the town in the village of Kiby.

Media
The newspaper Varangeren was published in Vadsø from 2007 to 2012.

See also
List of towns and cities in Norway

References

Cities and towns in Norway
Vadsø
Populated places of Arctic Norway
Port cities and towns in Norway